Costa Serina is a comune in the province of Bergamo, in Lombardy, northern Italy. Neighbouring communes are Algua, Aviatico, Bracca, Cornalba, Gazzaniga, Serina, Vertova and Zogno.

Notable people
 

Antonio Pietro Cortinovis (1885–1984),  Italian Roman Catholic professed religious

References

Cities and towns in Lombardy